The R207 road is a regional road in Ireland linking the N16 national primary road near the Northern Ireland border to the R280  10 km north of Carrick-on-Shannon in County Leitrim.

En route it passes through Dowra, follows the eastern shore of Lough Allen for 15 km to Drumshanbo. It terminates 3 km north of Leitrim village.

See also
Roads in Ireland
National primary road
National secondary road

References
Roads Act 1993 (Classification of Regional Roads) Order 2006 – Department of Transport

Regional roads in the Republic of Ireland
Roads in County Leitrim